The World Field Archery Championships is an international competition in field archery. Organised by World Archery, the Championships are held every two years, in host cities most frequently in Europe but occasionally in Australasia or North America.

Host cities

Championships

Champions

Men

Note: 1. Mixed team competition

Women

Note: 1. Mixed team competition

Junior Men

Note: 1. Unofficial

Junior Women

Note: 1. Unofficial

References

External links
 All time medal table of field archery

 
Field